Shah-Do Shamshira Mosque, the name translates to Mosque of the King of Two Swords, is a yellow two-story mosque in Kabul, Afghanistan (District 2) on Andarabi Road, just off the Kabul River and the Shah-Do Shamshira bridge in the center of the city. It was built during the reign of Amanullah Khan (1919–1929). It was modelled after the Ortaköy Mosque in Istanbul. The design of this mosque is quite unusual for Islamic religious architecture. Its Italian decorative stucco creates an interesting effect that some describe as ‘Afghan Baroque’.

The mosque is located next to the tomb of a Mughal general, Chin Timur Khan, who was also the cousin of the central Asian conqueror Babur. Chin Timur helped conquer much of India and is famous for the Battle of Khanwa, in which he took a leading role. Not far from here are the tombs of Babur and many other prominent Muslim commanders who invaded India from Afghanistan and established Muslim rule over northern India (including modern Pakistan and Bangladesh).

The shrine was the site of the killing of Farkhunda on March 19, 2015.

In June 2021, the mosque was fully renovated.

See also
 List of mosques in Afghanistan

References

Mosques in Kabul